Ashley Nicole Rickards (born May 4, 1992) is an American actress, known for her role as Jenna Hamilton in the MTV comedy-drama series Awkward, and as Samantha "Sam" Walker, a troubled young girl in The CW's teen drama series One Tree Hill. She also starred in the 2011 independent drama film Fly Away as Mandy, an autistic girl.

Early life and acting career
Rickards was born in Sarasota, Florida. She grew up on a horse farm that catered to children with special needs. She attended a local Montessori school where, at age 13, she had her first taste of acting in an opera production. Rickards graduated from high school at age fifteen and is a member of Mensa. After attending a local talent showcase, organized by Lou Pearlman, Rickards traveled to Los Angeles where she eventually gathered a team of representatives. Upon graduating, Rickards began to appear in a number of minor roles, while child labor laws restricted the number of hours she was able to work. After making a number of guest appearances and shorts, she landed the role of Samantha Walker, a runaway foster child, in the sixth season of The CW's One Tree Hill.<ref name="vulture.com">{{cite web |url=http://www.vulture.com/2012/07/awkward-ashley-rickards-interview.html |first=Denise |last=Martin |title='Awkwards Ashley Rickards on Latin Boys, Reverse Method Acting, and Idolizing Chris Colfer |work=Vulture |date=July 19, 2012}}</ref> Although not aware of the show before auditioning, Rickards found that she "learned so much from acting techniques to different ways of shooting things". Her character did not return the following season, while in the same year she had a bit part in her first feature film, Gamer.

Rickards spent much of 2009 attending auditions while a proposed lead role in the film Dirty Girl fell through. In 2010, she appeared opposite Jimmy Smits in an episode of the legal drama Outlaw while she also auditioned for the lead role in the MTV series Awkward. Initially rejected, her manager Adam Griffin sent the producers a tape Rickards had made for Fly Away "to show how she can do anything". The actress landed both roles and filmed the pilot for the MTV series prior to Fly Away, a feature where she played a girl with severe autism.

As the lead in Awkward, Rickards' profile began to rise and she was also given the opportunity to direct an episode. In 2012, she had a minor role in the moderately successful comedy Struck by Lightning and another coming-of-age film Sassy Pants. In 2014 Rickards moved into the horror genre with a lead role in At the Devil's Door and as a teenage daughter in A Haunted House 2. In 2015, she filmed the fifth and final season of Awkward. In August 2016 it was announced that Rickards would play Rosalind "Rosa" Dillon/The Top in the CW series The Flash.

Other activities
In 2011, Rickards helped to launch the Project Futures Somaly Mam Foundation, which works to prevent and end human trafficking and sexual slavery in Southeast Asia. In March 2015, she published a book A Real Guide to Getting It Together Once and For All''.

Over the course of her career, she has also appeared in various music videos such as The Fray's "How to Save a Life", The Format's "She Doesn't Get It" and M83's "Claudia Lewis".

Filmography

Film

Television

Music videos

Awards and nominations

References

External links
 
 Ashley Rickards at the Music Television
 Ashley Rickards Official Website

1992 births
21st-century American actresses
Actors from Sarasota, Florida
Actresses from Florida
American child actresses
American female equestrians
American film actresses
American television actresses
Living people
Mensans